is a former Japanese football player.

Playing career
Yoshida was born in Takamatsu on May 28, 1975. After graduating from high school, he joined Bellmare Hiratsuka in 1994. However he could hardly play in the match behind Nobuyuki Kojima. In 1999, he moved to new club Yokohama FC. Although he played several matches every season, he could hardly play in the match. He retired end of 2003 season.

Club statistics

References

External links

1975 births
Living people
Association football people from Kagawa Prefecture
Japanese footballers
J1 League players
J2 League players
Japan Football League players
Shonan Bellmare players
Yokohama FC players
People from Takamatsu, Kagawa
Association football goalkeepers